Monica Bonvicini (born 1965 in Venice) is a German-Italian artist. In her work, Bonvicini investigates the relationship between power structures, gender and space. She works intermediately with installation, sculpture, video, photography and drawing mediums. 

Her works have been featured at the Berlin Biennale, the Istanbul Biennial, and the Venice Biennale. She has installed permanent artworks at the Queen Elizabeth II Olympic Park in London, the harbour at the Oslo Opera House, the Istanbul Museum of Modern Art, and on the facade of the Weserburg in Bremen.

Education
Bonvicini studied at the Hochschule der Künste in Berlin and at the California Institute of the Arts in Valencia. From 1998 to 2002 Bonvicini lived in Los Angeles and taught at the Art Center College of Design in Pasadena.

Career
Bonvicini has lived and worked in Berlin since 1986. Bonvicini began exhibiting her work internationally in the mid-1990s. Bonvicini describes her practice as an exploration of relationships between architecture and space, power, gender, and sexuality. 

In 1998, she was featured at the Berlin Biennale. Bonvicini won the Golden Lion at the Venice Biennale in 1999. Bonvicini's works were included again at the Berlin Biennale in 2003, as well as at the Istanbul Biennial. 

In 2005, she was awarded the National Gallery Prize for Young Art in Berlin and was featured at the Venice Biennale, where she participated in again in 2011. 

Bonvicini was appointed Commander of the Order of Merit of the Italian Republic in 2012. In 2013, she was awarded the Rolandpreis für Kunst in Bremen. 

Her works were featured at the Berlin Biennale in 2014, the Venice Biennale in 2015, and the Istanbul Biennial in 2017.  

Bonvicini has served as a guest professor at the ArtCenter College of Design, after which she taught as Professor of Sculpture and Performance art at the Akademie der Bildenden Künste in Vienna. Since 2017, she has been the Professor of Sculpture at the Universität der Künste Berlin.  

Bonvicini won the Oskar Kokoschka Prize in Vienna in 2020.

In 2022, she obtained German citizenship and was further elected as a member of the Akademie der Künste, in the Visual Arts section.

Work

Bonvicini works with a variety of materials, not limited to, drywall, steel, polyurethane, metal, chains, wood, spray paint, aluminum, ink, tempera, concrete, and glass.  Bonvicini cites the usage of industrial material as a means of exploring the construction of sexual identity, as well as its clichés and origins, via architecture. Her research regularly delves into psychoanalysis, labour, feminism, design and urbanity, as well as how private and institutional spaces dictate codex of behavior. The artworks often employ language and text, humour and irony. Some of her pieces are courageously explicit, thus pushing and undermining institutional boundaries and questioning the role of spectator. Bonvicini is also commonly described as working site-specifically, creating discursive displays that relate to an exhibiting venue and its operational context. Bonvicini critically explores the legacy of modernism as both an artistic and a social period. She also frequently references minimalism, conceptual art, Institutional Critique, as well as feminist and queer subcultures and civil rights and other political movements.

I Believe the Skin of Things as in That of Women, 1999 
This work, entitled I Believe the Skin of Things as in That of Women, was created in 1998 by Bonvicini for an exhibition at Galerie Krobath Wimmer in Vienna. Harald Szeemann saw the work and invited Bonvicini to take a part in the upcoming Venice Biennale, where she was awarded the Golden Lion next year. The work examines gender relations, manifested in the field of architecture and construction. Bonvicini describes the work as a confrontation with the “boys club” attitude that often encompasses the world of architecture. The installation is an architectural space, constructed out of drywall panels with quotes from famous male architects, including Auguste Perret and Adolf Loos, drawn on it with graphite. The title of the work is the famous quote by Le Corbusier. The quotes are intertwined with cartoon-styled compositions of naked men performing a variety of sexual acts. Some of these drawings refer to the photographs of early modernist architecture that were supposed to depict and establish a canon of a new, modern domestic dwelling.  The work is an example of Bonvicini’s dry humour and fearless content that is seen in many of her other works.

She Lies, 2010 

A permanent installation She Lies was publicly revealed on May 11, 2010. The work, commissioned by Public Art Norway, floats in Oslofjord in front of the Oslo Opera House. The work is made of styrofoam, stainless steel, reflecting glass panels, and glass splinters and stands on a concrete pontoon that is equipped with an anchoring system. The monumental sculpture (12 x 17 x 16 meters in size) is an interpretation of Caspar David Friedrich’s 1824 painting Das Eismeer. Bonvicini reuses the imagery of the ice masses seen in Friedrich’s painting as a symbolic reference to romanticism and its ideals that established different common and fixed clichés, such as art and art professionalism, but also of nature and scientific exploration. Reacting to the changing tides, the installation turns around its axis and moves within a range of 50 meters. The mirrors and transparent pieces provide constantly changing reflections. Bonvicini describes the work as “A monument to a state of permanent change.”

RUN, 2012 
RUN is a permanent installation at the Queen Elizabeth Olympic Park in London that was installed for the 2012 Summer Olympics. The work’s composition and title were inspired by the lyrics and language in popular music. The work pays reference to specific songs, including The Velvet Underground’s “Run, Run, Run”, Neil Young’s “Running Dry” and Bruce Springsteen’s “Born to Run”. Constructed from steel and reflective glass, the three installed characters are nine meters tall and each piece weighs ten tons. Bonvicini’s work stands in the plaza of the Copper Box Arena, and is the largest installation in the park.

The nine-meter-high installation consists of three letters made of steel and glass, which during the day reflects the surroundings through its reflective surfaces. Installed inside there are 8000 LED lights that define the inner contours of the letters. The further use of the mirror glass inside the construction creates the so-called infinity mirror effect over a large area, which gives the letters a visual dynamic. While the work of art projects the natural changes caused by the light conditions during the day, they develop a luminous visual pull at night, which reinforces the title of the work again. The installation is currently being repaired following incidents of vandalism at the plant.

As Walls Keep Shifting, 2019 

As Walls Keep Shifting is a large-scale, site-specific artwork. A wooden structure of half a house, disassembled in three parts. Without walls, without windows, it is built anew and in dialogue with each new institution it encounters.

The artwork, last exhibited in 2022 at Kunsthaus Graz, presents itself as a scaffolding of a one-family residence constructed on a 1:1 scale. Originally conceived and erected in a double pack for economic reasons, these semi-detached houses can still be found nowadays in the northern regions of Italy. 

Bonvicini's appropriation and adaptation of this type of house - was first shown in its original version at the OGR in Turin in 2019. In Graz, the sculpture lies scattered around the place, like the remains of a calculated disaster: the upper floor slides upon the ground floor wedging itself onto it, while the roof leans against the Kunsthaus' walls, menacing to take over the entire space. 

The artwork’s title, As Walls Keep Shifting, refers to the “House of Leaves” novel by Mark Z. Danielewski, similarly rendering a powerful metaphorical image of the house as a living space. The timber construction reflects the power dynamics of the family system, the socio-economic periphery and its chaos. The project questions the establishment of private space together with its resulting discontents, such as seclusion, intimate dynamics, disappointment and reactionary feelings.

The architectural sculpture can be considered as a bio construction: with a wooden house you have an energy saving of 40 to 50% on average compared to concrete or brick buildings. Solid wood does not burn, it chars slowly and only on the surface; if matched with specific insulating materials it allows for a very low energy consumption. As Walls Keep Shifting is made of about 20 cubic meters of solid fir wood, about 12 tons of wood and more than 1000 screws.

Video works 
Besides sculptural and two-dimensional works, Bonvicini also created numerous videos and multimedia installations. These artworks follow the topics common to her practice, interrogating the politics of body, gender, space, architecture and art institutions. Sometimes they stem from performances, like her video work “No Head Man,” which originated in the performance conceived for the 27th São Paulo Art Biennial. The works of moving image are often minimalistic, drawing on references to the history of European Nouvelle Vague / Auteur cinema and avant-garde video artists, like Jack Goldstein. The video art of Bonvicini, with artworks such as Hausfrau Swinging, 1997, Hammering Out (an old argument), 1998, Destroy She Said, 1998, and No Head Man, 2009, are included in renowned collections worldwide, including Julia Stoschek collection, Sammlung Hoffmann, FRAC Lorraine and Castello di Rivoli to mention few.

Hurricanes and Other Catastrophes, 2006-ongoing 

From 2008, Bonvicini commenced her black-and-white painting series, dedicated to the topics of natural disasters, and their ensuing architectural debris and social catastrophes. The artworks resulted from the artist being invited to participate in the 1st New Orleans Biennial, with Bonvicini using images found in media or taken by the artist herself while visiting New Orleans after it had been struck by Hurricane Katrina in 2005. The works seek to draw the attention to the political origins and social consequences of the global warming that cause storms and hurricanes to be stronger and occur more often than in the past.

NEVER TIRE, 2020 
NEVER TIRE is a large-scale series of drawings made by Monica Bonvicini dealing with the political and emotional upheaval of the last year. The drawings feature phrases, lyrics and quotes reworked from fragments of text by authors such as Judith Butler, Natalie Diaz, Soraya Chemaly, Andrea Dworkin and the memoirs of Philip Johnson. The sentences are cut, reversed and changed to be given new meaning, often playing on the aesthetic of graffiti and protest signs. The series was first exhibited in the solo exhibition Monica Bonvicini: Lover's Material at Kunsthalle Bielefeld.

Exhibitions (selection) 
2022: Neue Nationalgalerie, Berlin, I do You
2022: Kunsthaus Graz, I Don't Like You Very Much
2020: Italian Cultural Institute Stockholm, Power Joy Humor Resistance
2020: Kunsthalle Bielefeld, Lover's Material
2019: OGR Torino, As Walls Keep Shifting
2019: Belvedere 21, Vienna, I CANNOT HIDE MY ANGER
2018 König Galerie, Berlin, GUILT 
2018: Monash University Museum of Art, Melbourne, Unsettlement
2017-18:  Berlinische Galerie, Berlin, 3612,54 m³ vs 0,05 m³
2017: Istanbul Biennial, a good neighbour
2017: Deichtorhallen, Hamburg, Elbphilharmonie Revisited
2016: BALTIC Centre for Contemporary Art, Gateshead, her hand around the room
 2014: Witte de With - Center for Contemporary Art, Rotterdam, The Crime was almost perfect
 2013: Hamburger Bahnhof, Berlin, Wall Works
 2013: Kunsthalle Mainz, Monica Bonvicini Sterling Ruby
 2012: Museum Abteiberg, Mönchengladbach, und Deichtorhallen, Hamburg, Desire, Desiese, Devise – Zeichnungen 1986–2012.
 2012: La Triennale (3), Palais de Tokyo, Paris
 2011: Centro de Arte Contemporaneo de Malága
 2011: Museum Ludwig, Cologne
 2011: Dublin Contemporary 2011, Dublin
 2010: Kunsthalle Fridericianum, Kassel; Both Ends
 2009: The Art Institute of Chicago
2009: Frac des Pays de la Loire
 2009: Kunstmuseum Basel
 2008: MARCO, Museo de Arte Contemporánea de Vigo, Vigo
 2008: New Orleans Biennal (1), New Orleans
 2007: Bonniers Konsthall, Stockholm
 2005: Hamburger Bahnhof, Berlin
 2002: New Museum of Contemporary Art, New York
 2002: Palais de Tokyo, Paris
 2002: Museum of Modern Art, Oxford
 1994: Kunst-Werke, Berlin

Works in public collections (selection) 
 TBA21 - Thyssen-Bornemisza Art Contemporary, Wien
 Neue Nationalgalerie, Berlin
 Fondazione MAXXI, Rome
Frac des Pays de la Loire, Carquefou
 FRAC Lorraine, Metz
 Museo d'Arte Contemporanea Castello di Rivoli, Turin
 Museion, Bozen
 Migros Museum für Gegenwartskunst, Zürich
 Museum of Modern Art (MOMA), New York
 Lenbachhaus, München
 Museum of Art in Łódź, Lodz
 Julia Stoschek Collection, Berlin

Publications (selection) 

 Kunsthalle Bielefeld, Christina Végh (Hrsg.): Monica Bonvicini. Hot Like Hell. Kat. Kunsthalle Bielefeld, Snoeck Verlagsgesellschaft, Köln 2021. 
 Belvedere 21 (Hrsg.): I CANNOT HIDE MY ANGER. König Books, 2019. 
 Berlinische Galerie (Hrsg.): Monica Bonvicini. Kerber Verlag, 2017. 
 Monica Bonvicini. Survey by Janet Kraynak, Interview by Alexander Alberro, Focus by Juliane Rebentisch, Artist’s Writing by Monica Bonvicini. Phaidon Press, 2014. 
 Museum Abteiberg Mönchengladbach, Deichtorhallen Hamburg/Sammlung Falckenberg (Hrsg.): Monica Bonvicini – Disegni. Distanz Verlag, Berlin 2012. 
 Kunsthalle Fridericianum (Hrsg.): Monica Bonvicini. Both Ends. Kunsthalle Fridericianum und Verlag der Buchhandlung Walther König, Köln 2010. 
 Secession Wien (Hrsg.): Monica Bonvicini / Sam Durant. Break it / Fix it. Revolver Publishing, Frankfurt (am Main) 2003.

Bibliography (selection)
 Casati, R. (Host). (2020, October 98). The Grisebach-Podcast (No.10) [Audio podcast episode] Accessed 15 February 2021: https://grisebach.podigee.io/10-neue-episode
 Jennifer Allen. "You Have Something under Your Belt and Something over Your Head. And You Need Both" Spike Art Magazine. Accessed August 2, 2018: https://www.spikeartmagazine.com/en/articles/monica-bonvicini-you-have-something-under-your-belt-and-something-over-your-head-and-you
 Massimiliano Gioni. "Monica Bonvicini. Destroy She Says" Flash Art. Accessed August 2, 2018: https://www.flashartonline.com/article/monica-bonvicini/ 
Alexander Alberro, Janet Kraynak and Juliane Rebentisch, Monica Bonvicini, Phaidon Press, London, 2014.
 Art Agenda. "Monica Bonvicini – She Lies in Oslo." 2011. Accessed March 11, 2017. http://www.art-agenda.com/shows/monica-bonvicini-she-lies-in-oslo/.
 BALTIC Centre for Contemporary Art . "Monica Bonvicini." Accessed February 2017. http://www.balticmill.com/whats-on/monica-bonvicini
 Dan Cameron and Susanne von Falkenhausen, Monica Bonvicini, Hopefulmonster, Turin, 2000. 
 Harald Falkenberg, Susanne Titz and Bettina Steinbrügge, Monica Bonvicini: Disegni, Distanz, Berlin, 2012.
 Jane Harris. "Monica Bonvicini." Art Forum, 2003, Accessed February 2017. https://www.artforum.com/index.php?pn=interview&id=1061
 Jan Verwoert, Matthias Mühling and Nikola Dietrich, Monica Bonvicini, DuMont, Cologne, 2009.
 Jonas Marx. "Monica Bonvicini – She Lies in Oslo." Art Agenda. 2010. Accessed February 2017. http://www.art-agenda.com/shows/monica-bonvicini-she-lies-in-oslo/.
 The Museum of Modern Art.  "Monica Bonvicini | Artist.". Accessed February 2017. https://www.moma.org/artists/28568
 Monica Bonvicini. "Monica Bonvicini." Accessed February 2017. http://monicabonvicini.net/.
 The Telegraph. "Olympic Park artwork is up and running." The Telegraph. January 13, 2012. Accessed March 15, 2017. https://www.telegraph.co.uk/sport/olympics/london-2012-festival/9013345/Olympic-Park-artwork-is-up-and-running.html.
 Vanessa Joan Müller and Ursula Maria Probst, Monica Bonvicini: BOTH ENDS, Verlag der Buchhandlung Walther König, Cologne, 2010

Works

References

External links 
Artist's website
Monica Bonvicini at Galeria Raffaella Cortese 
Monica Bonvicini at Peter Kilchmann gallery
Monica Bonvicini at Mitchell-Innes & Nash gallery

Gregory Mario Whitfield's 3AM review of 'Anxiety Attack' at MAO 

1965 births
Living people
Artists from Venice
20th-century Italian sculptors
21st-century Italian sculptors
Italian women photographers
Italian contemporary artists
Italian women sculptors
20th-century Italian women artists
21st-century Italian women artists